Sarytoghay, also known as Sarytogay, (Sarytoğai, سارىتوعاي; , Sarytogay) is a town in Atyrau Region, west Kazakhstan.

References

Atyrau Region
Cities and towns in Kazakhstan